Shaukat Mirza Baig (born 5 June 1959) is a former Pakistani first-class cricketer. In a career that lasted for over 20 years, Shaukat played for Karachi and Habib Bank Limited.

References

1959 births
Living people
Pakistani cricketers
Habib Bank Limited cricketers
Karachi cricketers
Cricketers from Karachi
Karachi B cricketers
Industrial Development Bank of Pakistan cricketers
Karachi Whites cricketers
Pakistan Automobiles Corporation cricketers
Karachi Blues cricketers
House Building Finance Corporation cricketers
Pakistani cricket coaches